Caner Dagli is a Circassian-American Islamic scholar and associate professor of Religious Studies at the College of the Holy Cross in Worcester, Massachusetts.

Biography
Dagli is of Circassian origin and was born in the United States. He graduated from Cornell University with a B.A. in Near Eastern studies and completed his M.A in religion with special emphasis on Islam from George Washington University. He received his PhD in Near Eastern Studies from Princeton University. From 2005 to 2008, he served as an assistant professor at Roanoke College in Salem, Virginia and was an advisor for interfaith affairs to the Royal Hashemite Court of Jordan from 2006 to 2007. As a Muslim, Dagli was a signatory to the open letter, A Common Word Between Us and You.

Works
 The Ringstones of Wisdoms (Translator) (Great Books of the Islamic World Series, 2004)
 The Oxford Encyclopedia of Philosophy, Science, and Technology in Islam (ed.) (2014)
 The Study Quran: A New Translation and Commentary (Translator, commentary writer and general editor) (2015) with Seyyed Hossein Nasr (editor-in-chief),  Joseph E. B. Lumbard, Maria Massi Dakake and Mohammed Rustom.
 Ibn al-‘Arabī and Islamic Intellectual Culture: From Mysticism to Philosophy (2016)

See also
 William Chittick
 İbrahim Kalın
 Waleed El-Ansary

References

Articles with hCards
Living people
Year of birth missing (living people)
21st-century Muslim theologians
American Muslims
American religion academics
Ibn Arabi scholars
Translators of the Quran into English
American people of Circassian descent
Traditionalist School
Cornell University alumni
George Washington University alumni
Princeton University alumni
Muslim scholars of Islamic studies